The National Council of Social Service (NCSS) is a statutory board under the Ministry of Social and Family Development of the Government of Singapore.

The organisation is the national coordinating body for Voluntary Welfare Organisations (VWOs) in Singapore.

The Social Service Institute and the Community Chest are part of the National Council of Social Service.

See also
List of social service agencies in Singapore

References

External links
The website of the National Council of Social Service

1992 establishments in Singapore
Organisations of the Singapore Government
Medical and health organisations based in Singapore